Startalk, formerly called as Startalk: The Only Showbiz Authority and Startalk TX is a Philippine television talk show broadcast by GMA Network. Originally hosted by Boy Abunda, Kris Aquino and Lolit Solis, it premiered on October 8, 1995, replacing Show & Tell. The show is the longest-running entertainment news and talk show in Philippine television. The show concluded on September 12, 2015, with a total of 1,024 episodes. Solis, Butch Francisco, Joey de Leon, Ricky Lo and Heart Evangelista served as the final hosts. It was replaced by CelebriTV in its timeslot.

Overview
Startalk premiered on October 8, 1995, and was filmed at the Fernandina Suites. Boy Abunda, Kris Aquino and Lolit Solis served as the hosts. Aquino left the show in 1996 and Dawn Zulueta later joined as a host. In 1997, Zulueta quit the show and Rosanna Roces served as her replacement. The show also featured Steve, Fayatollah and Pepita as segment hosts of T! The Tigbak Authority. Steve also served as a regular voice-over for the show. The show later added new segments such as Da Who, Startalk True Stories and Alok Bati. On June 5, 1999, Abunda departed the show and was replaced by Butch Francisco. In June 2004, Roces left the show.

Lorna Tolentino and Joey de Leon became guest co-hosts until they were promoted as regular hosts. In 2008, Tolentino left the show and Ricky Lo of The Philippine Star served as her replacement.

In April 2010, the show was retitled as Startalk TX. In 2013, Heart Evangelista joined as a host. The show's 1,000th episode aired on March 21, 2015, while its 1,024th episode served as the final episode. It featured a lookback on the show with clips of the previously aired episodes and a segment featuring Abunda.

Hosts

 Lolit Solis 
 Boy Abunda 
 Kris Aquino 
 Dawn Zulueta 
 Rosanna Roces 
 Butch Francisco 
 Lorna Tolentino 
 Joey de Leon 
 Ricky Lo 
 Heart Evangelista 

Segment hosts
 Pepita 
 Fayatollah 
 Steve 
 Chariz Solomon 
 Jan Manual 
 Vaness del Moral 
 Alyssa Alano 
 Nina Kodaka 
 Nathalie Hart

Ratings
According to AGB Nielsen Philippines' Mega Manila household television ratings, the final episode of Startalk scored a 12.7% rating.

Accolades

References

External links
 

1995 Philippine television series debuts
2015 Philippine television series endings
Entertainment news shows in the Philippines
Filipino-language television shows
GMA Network original programming
Philippine television talk shows